The 14321 / 14322 Ala Hazrat Express (via Bhildi) is an Express train belonging to Northern Railway zone that runs between  and  in India. It is currently being operated with 14321/14322 train numbers on a four day weekly basis.

The train is named in the memory of a reformer of the 19th century Ala Hazrat Ahmed Raza Khan who is famous around the world.

About the train

 Ala Hazrat Express The 14311/14312 Via Ahmedabad & 14321/14322 Via Bhildi Express train belonging to Indian Railways that run between Bareilly and Bhuj in India. It is a Daily service. It operates as train number 14311/14321 from Bareilly to Bhuj and as train number 14312/14322 in the reverse direction.

Service

The 14321/Ala Hazrat Express has an average speed of 51 km/hr and covers 1412 km in 27h 40m. The 14322/Ala Hazrat Express has an average speed of 51 km/hr and covers 1412 km in 27h 35m.

Route & Halts 
The important stops of the train include:

Coach composition

The train has standard LHB rakes with max speed of 130 kmph. The train consists of 22 coaches:

 1 AC II Tier
 4 AC III Tier
 10 Sleeper coaches
 5 General
 2 Seating cum Luggage Rake

Traction

Both trains are hauled by a Sabarmati Loco Shed based WDP-4D diesel locomotive from Bhuj up to Ajmer after which a Ghaziabad Loco Shed based WAP-5 / WAP-7 electric locomotive hauls the train towards remaining of the journey till Bareilly.

Direction reversal
Train reverses its direction 1 times:

Rake sharing
The train shares its rake with 14311/14312 Ala Hazrat Express (via Ahmedabad).

See also 

 Bareilly Junction railway station
 Bhuj railway station
 Ala Hazrat Express

Notes

References

External links 

 14321/Ala Hazrat Express India Rail Info
 14322/Ala Hazrat Express India Rail Info

Transport in Bhuj
Trains from Bareilly
Named passenger trains of India
Rail transport in Gujarat
Rail transport in Rajasthan
Rail transport in Haryana
Rail transport in Delhi
Express trains in India
Memorials to Ahmed Raza Khan Barelvi